Katharine O'Brien is an American film director, screenwriter, film editor, camera operator, art director, and executive producer best known for her work on The Automatic Hate and Lost Transmissions.

Career 
She started directing, writing, and editing several short films including Night Taxi (2008), Waiting Room (2009), Doppleganger (2009), The Park (2010), Illusive Fields (2012), and Breaking News (2018). In 2015, Katharine O'Brien co-wrote her feature film debut The Automatic Hate, starring Joseph Cross. The film had its world premiere at South by Southwest on May 14, 2015, followed by a worldwide theatrical release on March 11, 2016.

In 2019, O'Brien directed and wrote Lost Transmissions, starring Simon Pegg. The film had its world premiere at the Tribeca Film Festival on April 28, 2019, followed by a North American theatrical release on March 13, 2020.

Awards
At the 2020 Prague Independent Film Festival, Katherine won the Grand Prix for Lost Transmissions.

Filmography

References

External links 
 

21st-century American screenwriters
21st-century American women writers
American film directors
American film editors
American screenwriters
American women film directors
American women film editors
English-language film directors
Living people
Place of birth missing (living people)
Year of birth missing (living people)